Abdullah Bo Homail (born July 10, 1986) is a Saudi football player who plays as a winger .

References

1986 births
Living people
Saudi Arabian footballers
Al-Fateh SC players
Hajer FC players
Al-Adalah FC players
Al Omran Club players
Al-Nojoom FC players
Saudi First Division League players
Saudi Professional League players
Saudi Second Division players
Association football wingers
Saudi Fourth Division players